In the United States, a Foreign Service brat (also referred to as diplobrat or FSB) is a person whose parent(s) served full-time in a Foreign Service posting abroad during that person's childhood. The term brat is often thought of as derogatory; however, for some who have experienced this background, the term has a neutral feel and is sometimes taken as a sign of pride. A Foreign Service brat may spend the majority of their childhood outside their parents' home country.

Like similar groups, such as military brats, missionary kids, or other third culture kids, Foreign Service brats are faced with frequent moves, and possibly the absence of a parent.  Some Foreign Service brats will grow up to take on roles similar to their parents, while the majority will pursue a private sector career. Many of these children feel very different from their peers if they are eventually "repatriated".

Notable former Foreign Service brats 

  Stewart Copeland, drummer for the Police
  Greg Kinnear, actor
  John Kerry, former United States Secretary of State and Presidential candidate
  Kathleen Turner, actress
  William Hurt, actor
  Dylan Walsh, actor
  Oliver Platt, actor
  Chris Van Hollen, United States Senator from Maryland
  Stephen Geyer, songwriter
  Michael Learned, actress
  Mitski, musician

See also
 United States Foreign Service

References

External links 
 Associates of the American Foreign Service Worldwide: online resources and community for U.S. diplomatic families.

United States Department of State
Childhood-related stereotypes